SpaceX CRS-19, also known as SpX-19, was a Commercial Resupply Service mission to the International Space Station. The mission is contracted by NASA and was flown by SpaceX on a Falcon 9 rocket.

Dragon capsule C106 made its third flight on CRS-19 having previously flown on CRS-4 and CRS-11. Dragon successfully returned to Earth on 7 January 2020 after a month-long stay at the ISS.

Launch schedule history

In February 2016, it was announced that NASA had awarded a contract extension to SpaceX for five CRS additional missions (CRS-16 to CRS-20). In June 2016, a NASA Inspector General report had this mission manifested for December 2018. The mission was later delayed to 15 October 2019, but launched in December 2019.

On 5 December 2019, CRS-19 launched successfully, followed by a successful first stage landing on the barge Of Course I Still Love You.

Payload
NASA has contracted for the CRS-19 mission from SpaceX and therefore determines the primary payload, date/time of launch, and orbital parameters for the Dragon space capsule.

The following is a breakdown of cargo bound for the ISS:
 Science investigations: 
 Crew supplies: 
 Vehicle hardware: 
 Spacewalk equipment: 
 Computer resources: 
 External payloads:
 Hyperspectral Imaging Suite (HISUI): ~
 Robotic Tool Stowage (RiTS)
 Lithium-ion battery

Among the science experiments transported to the station are the Anheuser-Busch-sponsored Germination of ABI Voyager Barley Seeds in Microgravity, the Confined Combustion experiment, and 40 genetically engineered mice as part of the Rodent Research-19 experiment.

A number of CubeSats were launched on CRS-19. The ELaNa-25B flight included AzTechSat-1, SORTIE, and CryoCube, while the ELaNa-28 flight included CIRiS and EdgeCube. Other small satellites launched on this mission include QARMAN and MakerSat-1.

See also
 Uncrewed spaceflights to the International Space Station

References

SpaceX Dragon
Spacecraft launched in 2019
SpaceX payloads contracted by NASA
Supply vehicles for the International Space Station
Spacecraft which reentered in 2020